Gao Xiang ( 217–240s) was a military general of the state of Shu Han in the Three Kingdoms period of China.

Life
Gao Xiang served as General of the Right. He followed Liu Bei on the Hanzhong Campaign between 217 and 219. Gao Xiang and Chen Shi camped at Yangping but were defeated by Cao Cao's general Xu Huang. In 228, Gao Xiang followed Zhuge Liang on the Northern Expeditions, serving as a subordinate of Ma Su, and they stationed at Liucheng. When Ma Su was defeated and Liucheng fell to the enemy general Guo Huai, Gao Xiang retreated. In 231, Gao Xiang was appointed Front Commander, leading an army together with Wei Yan and Wu Ban, defeating the enemy commander Sima Yi. They collected 3,000 enemy heads, 5,000 suits of armour, and 3,100 crossbows. When the supply official Li Yan failed in his mission, Gao Xiang and Zhuge Liang proposed that Li be relieved of his duties. Gao Xiang maintained General of the Right until at least 233, where Fu Kuang succeeded Gao, it is unknown if the later simply died or retired from the army. Considering Yang Xi's Ji Han Fuchen Zan which oddly doesn't feature the former General of the Right Gao, it may be reasoned to assume he died after 241 as a civilian.

In Romance of the Three Kingdoms
Gao Xiang appears in Chapter 91 of the 14th-century historical novel Romance of the Three Kingdoms as a Center Army Right General, and he fills a minor role in the following chapters, being stationed near Liliu, he joins with Wei Yan and Wang Ping to retake Jieting. However they fail and Ma Su is executed by Zhuge Liang for the defeat.

Later Gao Xiang is involved in Zhuge Liang's Northern Expeditions. In chapter 102, he leads 500 men disguised as soldiers of Wei. Their purpose is to capture the wooden oxen that are part of the Wei convoy.

See also
 Lists of people of the Three Kingdoms

References

 Chen, Shou (3rd century). Records of the Three Kingdoms (Sanguozhi).
 Luo, Guanzhong (14th century). Romance of the Three Kingdoms (Sanguo Yanyi).
 Pei, Songzhi (5th century). Annotations to Records of the Three Kingdoms (Sanguozhi zhu).
 Sima, Guang (1084). Zizhi Tongjian.

Year of birth unknown
3rd-century deaths
Shu Han generals
People from Jingzhou
Generals from Sichuan